ZBT may refer to: 

 ZBT Appendix, bilateral master contract for trading natural gas on the Zeebrugge Hub
 Zero Bus Turnaround memory
 Zeta Beta Tau
 Zimmerberg Base Tunnel